Line 1 is rapid transit line of the Ho Chi Minh City Metro, Vietnam. Line 1 is the city's first metro line, connecting District 1 and Thu Duc City. The line began construction in 2012, initially scheduled for completion in 2018. The project's completion date has been delayed to the end of 2023. Ticket prices will range from VND9,000-23,000 ($0.39-1) per trip.

History 
The line was designed by Nippon Koei. The above-ground section was constructed by a joint venture between the Japanese rail corporation Sumitomo Group and Vietnamese state-owned corporation Cienco 6. The underground section was constructed by two Japanese companies, Shimizu Corporation and Maeda Corporation. 83% of the project finance was provided by Japanese government loans through Japan International Cooperation Agency, while the rest was provided by the Vietnamese government.

On 13 September 2017, the authorities announced that Line 1 would be delayed for two years. Cost overruns, audits, and delayed payments to contractors contributed to the delay. The targeted completion date was set for 2020. Planners expect the route to serve more than 160,000 passengers daily upon launch, increasing to 635,000 by 2030 and 800,000 by 2040. All stations along the route are expected to accommodate the disabled, with automatic ticket vending machines, telephone booths, restrooms, subway doors and information bulletins accessible to the handicapped and visually impaired.

On 28 January 2019, MAUR Director of Project Management Unit Duong Huu Hoa stated that as of December 2018, construction progress of Line 1 has reached 62%, below the target of 65%. The project has been criticised by the local press for its repeated delays.

By August 2022, the line is 92% complete. 17 Hitachi train sets had arrived and are undergoing testing.

Stations

References 

Transport in Ho Chi Minh City
Public transport in Ho Chi Minh City
2023 in rail transport
Rapid transit in Vietnam
Underground rapid transit in Vietnam
Ho Chi Minh City Metro lines